A Colt from the Country is a novel by Arthur Wright. It takes place on Manly Beach and the racecourses of Sydney.

References

External links
A Colt from the Country at AustLit
Copy of serialised story at World's News in 1921 – 26 March, 2 April, 9 April, 16 April, 23 April, 30 April, 7 May, 14 May, 21 May, 28 May, 4 June, 11 June, 18 June, 25 June, 2 July, 9 July 

1922 Australian novels
Australian sports novels
Horse racing novels
Novels set in Sydney